Broadgreen Hospital is a teaching hospital in the eastern suburb of Broadgreen in the city of Liverpool, England. The hospital, alongside the Royal Liverpool University Hospital and Liverpool University Dental Hospital in the city centre is managed by the Liverpool University Hospitals NHS Foundation Trust.

History

The hospital was established as an epileptic home known as the Highfield Infirmary in 1903. It became the Highfield Sanatorium for tuberculosis sufferers in 1922, the Broadgreen Sanatorium in 1929 and, on joining the National Health Service it became the Broadgreen Hospital in 1946. Following a review of local health care provisions within the city in 1989 and the ongoing reforms of the NHS, the local health authority of the time opted to close the accident and emergency department and centralise the facility at the Royal Liverpool University Hospital. Despite fierce opposition at the proposals from members of the public, staff at the hospital and local GP's and politicians - Broadgreen Hospital A&E Department was shut down on a phased basis from 1994, before closing permanently in 1996.

Notable patients
Bill Shankly, the former Liverpool Football Club manager, died at the hospital in September 1981 after suffering a heart attack.

Facilities
Non-clinical facilities provided at the hospital include a café operated by Royal Voluntary Service, free cash points, a restaurant and some vending machines.

See also
 List of hospitals in England

References

External links
 Royal Liverpool and Broadgreen University Hospital Trust
 MultiMap
 Radio Broadgreen

Hospitals in Liverpool
Teaching hospitals in England
NHS hospitals in England
University of Liverpool